Drasteria kusnezovi is a moth of the family Erebidae first described by Oscar John in 1910. It is found in Kazakhstan and Uzbekistan.

References

Drasteria
Moths described in 1910
Moths of Asia